Johnson State Prison is located in Wrightsville, Georgia in Johnson County, Georgia. It is a medium security prison owned and operated by the Georgia Department of Corrections, it houses adult male felons. The facilities' capacity is 1600 inmates. Construction began in 1991 and it was opened in 1992.  In 1996 Johnson State prison was converted into a Juvenile Boot Camp "Wrightsville Boot Camp" for short term (30-180 Days) and long term (180 days up to a maximum of 1 year) Juvenile delinquent offenders as status or repeat/habitual offenders. It was shut down as a boot camp 2 years later due to restructuring of the Juvenile Justice system throughout the state and converted back to adult male felon offenders in 1998 and all current juvenile offenders where transferred to other facilities throughout the state.

Housing Departments 
Supportive Living Unit - Mental Health   Capacity 96 inmates  (double bunk)
Assisted Living Unit - General Inmates   Capacity 72 inmates  (segregation - isolation)

Work Detail
Work Detail is where inmates have unpaid jobs and duties assigned by the prison or state.
Work assigned for Johnson State Prison inmates is from the City Of Wrightsville, Georgia, City Of Sandersville, Georgia, City Of Swainsboro, Georgia, and Georgia Department Of Transportation.

Programs
Academic: Literacy, GED, ABE, GSAMS
Substance Abuse: Residential Substance Abuse Treatment (RSAT), Prevention Redesign Initiative (PRI)
Counseling: Corrective Thinking, Stress Management, Pre-Release, Mental Health Awareness, Victim Impact
Recreation: General Recreation
Religious Activities: Various Religious Activities
Vocational/OJT: Building Maintenance, Horticulture, Laundry and Customer Service

References

Sources
ALL INFORMATION ON THIS PAGE IS FROM THE GEORGIA DEPARTMENT OF CORRECTIONS

Buildings and structures in Johnson County, Georgia
Prisons in Georgia (U.S. state)
1992 establishments in Georgia (U.S. state)